is a former Japanese football player and manager. He played for Japan national team.

Club career
Nishimura was born in Osaka Prefecture on August 8, 1958. After graduating from Osaka University of Health and Sport Sciences, he joined his local club Yammer Diesel in 1981. The club won 1983 and 1984 JSL Cup. He retired in 1991. He played 148 games and scored 3 goals in the league. He was selected Best Eleven in 1982.

National team career
On June 18, 1980, when Nishimura was an Osaka University of Health and Sport Sciences student, he debuted for Japan national team against Hong Kong. He played at 1984 Summer Olympics qualification, 1986 World Cup qualification, 1982 Asian Games and 1988 Summer Olympics qualification. He played 49 games and scored 2 goals for Japan until 1988.

Coaching career
After retirement, Nishimura started coaching career at Matsushita Electric (later Gamba Osaka) in 1991. In 1999, he became a manager for Japan U-20 national team. He managed U-20 Japan at the 2001 World Youth Championship in Argentina. In September 2001, he signed with Cerezo Osaka and became coach. In December, he became a manager as João Carlos successor and he led the club to won the 2nd place in Emperor's Cup. In October 2003, he was sacked. In 2004, he signed with Kyoto Purple Sanga. He was sacked in June.

Club statistics

National team statistics

Managerial statistics

References

External links
 
 Japan National Football Team Database

1958 births
Living people
Osaka University of Health and Sport Sciences alumni
Association football people from Osaka Prefecture
Japanese footballers
Japan international footballers
Japan Soccer League players
Cerezo Osaka players
Japanese football managers
J1 League managers
J2 League managers
Cerezo Osaka managers
Kyoto Sanga FC managers
Footballers at the 1986 Asian Games
Association football midfielders
Asian Games competitors for Japan